Elaeocyma ricaudae is a species of sea snails, a marine gastropod mollusc in the family Drilliidae.

Distribution
This species occurs in the demersal zone of the Pacific Ocean from Baja California to Panama.

References

  Tucker, J.K. 2004 Catalog of recent and fossil turrids (Mollusca: Gastropoda). Zootaxa 682:1–1295

External links
 

ricaudae
Gastropods described in 1969